Ethnic democracy is a political system that combines a structured ethnic dominance with democratic, political and civil rights for all. Both the dominant ethnic group and the minority ethnic groups have citizenship and are able to fully participate in the political process. Ethnic democracy differs from ethnocracy in that elements of it are more purely democratic. It provides the non-core groups with more political participation, influence and improvement of status than ethnocracy supposedly does. Nor is an ethnic democracy a Herrenvolk democracy which is by definition a democracy officially limited to the core ethnic nation only.

The term "ethnic democracy" was introduced by Professor Juan José Linz of Yale University in 1975, and subsequently by University of Haifa sociologist Professor Sammy Smooha in a book published in 1989,  as a universalised model of the Israel case. The model was used widely in subsequent decades; in 1993 for a comparison of several countries, in 1997 for a comparison of Israel and Northern Ireland, applied to Estonia and Latvia in 1996 and Slovakia in 2000.

Model definition 
Smooha defines eight features that are the core elements of his model of an ethnic democracy:
Ethnic nationalism installs a single core ethnic nation in the state.
The state separates membership in the single core ethnic nation from citizenship.
The state is owned and ruled by the core ethnic nation.
The state mobilises the core ethnic nation.
Non-core groups are accorded incomplete individual and collective rights.
The state allows non-core groups to conduct parliamentary and extra-parliamentary struggle for change.
The state perceives non-core groups as a threat.
The state imposes some control on non-core groups.

Smooha also defines ten conditions that can lead to the establishment of an ethnic democracy:
The core ethnic nation constitutes a solid numerical majority.
The non-core population constitutes a significant minority.
The core ethnic nation has a commitment to democracy.
The core ethnic nation is an indigenous group.
The non-core groups are immigrant.
The non-core group is divided into more than one ethnic group.
The core ethnic nation has a sizeable, supportive Diaspora.
The homelands of the non-core groups are involved.
There is international involvement.
Transition from a non-democratic ethnic state has taken place.

Applicability of the model 
The model has been applied by researchers to several countries, with various levels of fit.

Israel 
The State of Israel is seen as a country that utilises the ethnic democracy model in its relations with the country's Arab minority, as Israel has combined viable democratic institutions with institutionalized ethnic dominance.

Latvia and Estonia 

There is a spectrum of opinion among authors as to the classification of Latvia and Estonia, spanning from Liberal or Civic Democracy through Ethnic democracy to Ethnocracy. Will Kymlicka regards Estonia as a civic democracy, stressing the peculiar status of Russian-speakers, stemming from being at once partly transients, partly immigrants and partly natives. British researcher Neil Melvin concludes that Estonia is moving towards a genuinely pluralist democratic society through its liberalization of citizenship and actively drawing of leaders of the Russian settler communities into the political process. James Hughes, in the United Nations Development Programme's Development and Transition, contends Latvia and Estonia are cases of ‘ethnic democracy’ where the state has been captured by the titular ethnic group and then used to promote ‘nationalising’ policies and alleged discrimination against Russophone minorities. (Development and Transition has also published papers disputing Hughes' contentions.) Israeli researchers Oren Yiftachel and As’ad Ghanem consider Estonia as an ethnocracy.  Israeli sociologist Sammy Smooha, of the University of Haifa, disagrees with Yiftachel, contending that the ethnocratic model developed by Yiftachel does not fit the case of Latvia and Estonia; it is not a settler society as its core ethnic group is indigenous, nor did it expand territorially or have a diaspora intervening in its internal affairs as in the case of Israel for which Yiftachel originally developed his model.

However the notion that Estonia or Latvia are ethnic democracies has been rejected by some commentators. On the one hand, the citizenship laws of these countries are not based on ethnic criteria, treating citizens of Russian extract, including a number of people who automatically became citizens because their families have resided there since before 1940, with the same rights as the ethnic majorities. Moreover, non-citizens enjoy social rights on a par with citizens. On the other hand, given the proportion of non-citizen minorities without certain political rights (7.5% in the case of Estonia), Estonia and Latvia may not yet even qualify as ethnic democracies: in Smooha's definition of ethnic democracy, minority groups should enjoy full rights as citizens of the country.

Canada
Smooha describes Canada from independence in 1867 to the Quiet Revolution of 1976, which raised the status of French Canadians to the level of English Canadians, to have been an ethnic democracy.

Northern Ireland
Smooha describes the Government of Northern Ireland (1921–1972) from the Partition of Ireland in 1921 to the Sunningdale Agreement in 1972 as an ethnic democracy, favoring Protestants of mainly Ulster Scots descent to the native Irish Catholics.

Malaysia
Article 153 of the Constitution of Malaysia, as well as the Ketuanan Melayu (Malay supremacy) ideology followed by post-independence Malaysian governments since the 1970s, gives more rights to the Bumiputra in general and to Malaysian Malays than to Malaysian minorities, such as Malaysian Chinese and Malaysian Indians.

Slovakia
Slovak nationalism is grounded in ethnicity and language. "State-building and nation-building in Slovakia are designed to install ethnic Slovaks as the sole nation and to prevent any sign of binationalism. This objective is made clear in the preamble of the Slovak constitution which begins with the following words: “We, the Slovak nation, bearing in mind the political and cultural heritage of our predecessors, the experience gained through centuries of struggle for our national existence and statehood…”

Bibliography
 Sammy Smooha, The Model of Ethnic Democracy, ECMI Working Paper No 13, October 2001

References

Ethnicity in politics
Types of democracy